This is an overview of the 1980 Iranian legislative election in Tehran, Rey and Shemiranat electoral district. It resulted in a victory for Fakhreddin Hejazi of the Islamic Republican Party.

Results

First round

References

Parliamentary elections in Tehran
1980s in Tehran
1980 elections in Iran